Derry Clarke is an Irish celebrity chef, and was the proprietor of the restaurant L'Ecrivain. He has also been a reality television judge, having  acted as a judge alongside Bibi Baskin and Sammy Leslie on the RTÉ One reality television series Fáilte Towers, and has appeared on other programmes such as The Restaurant, The Afternoon Show and The Panel (in 2008).

Career
Clarke's professional career began at the age of sixteen years. He started his career in 1972, with Peter Barry, known for The Man Friday. He came back to Dublin in 1977 and worked in Le Coq Hardi in Dublin for four years, under John Howard. He also worked for eight years in Le Bon Appetit in Dublin.

Clarke has received international recognition, having been inducted into Food & Wine Magazine'''s "Hall of Fame" and been granted a five-star review by The New York Times. The newspaper described his restaurant as "superb" and "a good spot to linger" whilst in Dublin.

Derry completed a term as Commissioner General at EuroToques, but remains actively involved with EuroToques.
 
Eminent UK food critic A. A. Gill, not known for dishing out rave reviews, gave a positive review of L'Ecrivain. He noted that Derry's Wicklow venison was "among the best deer I've ever tasted", going on to describe L'Ecrivain as "a very decent, hospitable, friendly, stay-a-while hybrid restaurant".

Clarke's recipes feature in publications such as the Irish Independent and the Evening Herald.

He has written two cook books, which sold well, "Not Just Another Cookbook" and "Keeping it Simple". The recipes confirm his commitment to the very best local, fresh produce cooked with flair and imagination.

Roast leg of spring lamb has been one of Clarke's favourites since his childhood and he regularly cooks it for his own Sunday lunch. Asked about whether he cooks the family dinner on Christmas Day, he replied positively. He cooks goose on this day.

When Ranelagh's Dylan McGrath owned Mint shut down in 2009, Clarke expressed his sadness to the Evening Herald''.

Awards

 Michelin star: 2001–2018

Personal
Derry Clarke is married to Sallyanne. He had two children, a son and a daughter. His son died 31 December 2012, at the age of 16. Clarke had a double bypass operation in December 2013, after a warning that there was a family history of heart problems, that made him extra vulnerable for a heart attack.

References

Irish chefs
Irish television personalities
Living people
Year of birth missing (living people)
Place of birth missing (living people)
Head chefs of Michelin starred restaurants
Irish television chefs